The Greek pavilion houses Greece's national representation during the Venice Biennale arts festivals.

Background 

The Venice Biennale is an international art biennial exhibition held in Venice, Italy. Often described as "the Olympics of the art world", the Biennale is a prestigious event for contemporary artists known for propelling career visibility. The festival has become a constellation of shows: a central exhibition curated by that year's artistic director, national pavilions hosted by individual nations, and independent exhibitions throughout Venice. The Biennale parent organization also hosts regular festivals in other arts: architecture, dance, film, music, and theater.

Outside of the central, international exhibition, individual nations produce their own shows, known as pavilions, as their national representation. Nations that own their pavilion buildings, such as the 30 housed on the Giardini, are responsible for their own upkeep and construction costs as well. Nations without dedicated buildings create pavilions in venues throughout the city.

Organization and building 

Architect M. Papandréou designed the pavilion, which was built between 1933 and 1934. Brenno Del Giudice, who led the Biennale's Sant'Elena expansion, also collaborated on the project. The pavilion's simple layout includes a T-shaped hall. Greek and diamond patterns adorn the brickwork, and Greco-Byzantine round arches line the portico.

The exhibitions at the pavilion are commissioned by the Hellenic Ministry of Culture and Tourism.

Representation by year

Architecture 

 2018: "The School of Athens", curated by Xristina Argyros and Ryan Neiheiser, consisted of adjoining wooden steps with 3D-printed models of common spaces, such as Harvard's Carpenter Center (by Le Corbusier and Cambridge's courtyards.

 2010: "The Ark. Old Seeds for New Cultures" was a habitable wooden ark containing aromatic seeds, dried fruits, and plants. It had a working kitchen and sleeping area.

Art 

 1936 — Maria Anagnostopoulou, Umberto Argyros, Constantinos Artemis, Nicolas Asprogerakas (Commissioner: Typaldo Forestis)
 1936 — Konstantinos Maleas, Nikolaos Lytras, C. Stefanopoulo Alessandridi, Umberto Argyros, Aglae Papa (Commissioner: Typaldo Forestis) 
 1938 — Constantin Parthenis, Michalis Tombros, Angelos Theodoropoulos (Commissioners: Antonios Benakis, Typaldo Forestis)
 1940 — Aginor Asteriadis, Yannis Mitarakis, Pavlos Rodokanakis, Dimitris Vitsoris, Bella Raftopoulou, Costis Papachristopoulos, George Zongolopoulos, Dimitrios Ghianoukakis, Alexandros Korogiannakis, Efthimios Papadimitriou
 1950 — Bouzianis Giorgos
 1976 — Michael Michaeledes, Aglaia Liberaki (Commissioner: Sotiris Messinis)
 1978 — Yannis Pappas (Commissioner: Sotiris Messinis)
 1980 — Pavlos (Dionysopoulos) (Commissioners: Sotiris Messinis, Emmanuel Mavrommatis) 
 1982 — Diamantis Diamantopoulos, Costas Coulentianos (Commissioner: Sotiris Messinis)
 1984 — Christos Caras, George Georgiadis (Commissioner: Sotiris Messinis)
 1986 — Costas Tsoclis (Commissioners: Nelli Missirli, Sotiris Messinis)
 1988 — Vlassis Caniaris, Nikos Kessanlis (Commissioner: Emmanuel Mavrommatis)
 1990 — Georges Lappas, Yannis Bouteas (Commissioner: Manos Stefanidis)
 1993 — George Zongolopoulos (Commissioner: Efi Andreadi)
 1995 — Takis (Commissioner: Maria Marangou)
 1997 — Dimitri Alithinos, Stephen Antonakos, Totsikas, Alexandros Psychoulis (Commissioner: Efi Strousa)
 1999 — Costas Varotsos, Danae Stratou, Evanthia Tsantila (Commissioner: Anna Kafetsi)
 2001 — Nikos Navridis, Ilias Papailiakis, Ersi Chatziargyrou (Commissioner: Lina Tsikouta)
 2003 — Athanasia Kyriakakos, Dimitris Rotsios (Commissioner: Marina Fokidis)
 2005 — George Hadjimichalis (Commissioner: Katerina Koskina)
 2007 — Nikos Alexiou (Commissioner: Yorgos Tzirtzilakis)
 2009 — Lucas Samaras (Curator: Matthew Higgs)
 2011 — Diohandi (Curator: Maria Marangou)
 2013 — Stefanos Tsivopoulos (Curator: Syrago Tsiara)
 2015 — Maria Papadimitriou (Curator: Gabi Scardi)
 2017 — George Drivas (Curator: Orestis Andreadakis)

References

Bibliography

External links 

 

National pavilions
Greek contemporary art